Montmorency Township may refer to the following places in the United States:

 Montmorency Township, Whiteside County, Illinois
 Montmorency Township, Michigan

See also

Montmorency (disambiguation)

Township name disambiguation pages